The 2023 Columbia Lions football team will represent Columbia University as a member of the Ivy League during the 2023 NCAA Division I FCS football season. The team is led by eight-year head coach Al Bagnoli and play its home games at Robert K. Kraft Field at Lawrence A. Wien Stadium.

Previous season

The Lions finished the 2022 season with an overall record of 6–4 and a mark of 3–4 in conference play to place fifth in the Ivy League.

Schedule

References

Columbia
Columbia Lions football seasons
Columbia Lions football